L'impermeable is the name of the first waterproof watch invented at the end of the 19th century and manufactured by the West End Watch Company, one of the oldest Swiss brands still active.

Definition of epoxy waterproofing 

Waterproof (or water-resistant) describes objects unaffected by water or resisting water passage, or which are covered with a material that resists or does not allow water passage.

In horology, the waterproofness of a watch is defined by its resistance under pressure. The manufacturers indicate mostly the degree of waterproofness in metres (m), feet (ft) or atmospheres (atm). Watches with the "waterproof" name, with or without indication of overpressure, have to be complied and have to undergo successfully the tests planned in the standard ISO-2281. These watches are intended for a current daily use and have to resist to the water during exercises such as the short-term swimming.

So finally watches said waterresistant must : resist to a dive in the water in a depth of at least 100 metres (330 ft), have a system of control of time and answer all the criteria planned by the standard ISO 6425: luminosity, shock resistance, resistance in magnetic fields, solidity of the bracelet.

History 

The watchmaker company "Alcide Droz & Sons", established in St-Imier (Bern) since 1864, developed the first watch attested waterproof. They called it "L'Impermeable".

They had the idea to place a seal in the crown of winder, which is screwed on the counterpart. "L'Impermeable" was born: it is the very first waterproof watch intended especially to protect the movement from dust and humidity.

This pocket watch is nowadays on display at the International Watchmaking Museum in La Chaux-de-Fonds.

See also 

 West End Watch Co
  www.westendwatchusa.com 
 waterproof

References

External links 
 International Watchmaking Museum

Horology
Watches